Cities: Skylines is a 2015 city-building game developed by Colossal Order and published by Paradox Interactive. The game is a single-player open-ended city-building simulation. Players engage in urban planning by controlling zoning, road placement, taxation, public services, and public transportation of an area. They also work to manage various elements of the city, including its budget, health, employment, traffic, and pollution levels. It is also possible to maintain a city in a sandbox mode, which provides more creative freedom for the player.

Cities: Skylines is a progression of development from Colossal Order's previous Cities in Motion titles, which focused on designing effective transportation systems. While the developers felt they had the technical expertise to expand to a full city simulation game, their publisher Paradox held off on the idea, fearing the market dominance of SimCity. After the critical failure of the 2013 SimCity game, however, Paradox greenlit the title. The developer's goal was to create a game engine capable of simulating the daily routines of nearly a million unique citizens, while presenting this to the player in a simple way, allowing the player to easily understand various problems in their city's design. This includes realistic traffic congestion, and the effects of congestion on city services and districts. Since the game's release, various expansions and other DLC have been released for the game. The game also has built-in support for user-generated content.

The game was first released for the Linux, OS X, and Windows operating systems in March 2015, with ports to the Xbox One and PlayStation 4 game consoles being released in 2017, for the Nintendo Switch in September 2018, and for Google Stadia in May 2022 developed by Tantalus Media. A remastered edition was released for the PlayStation 5 and Xbox Series X/S in February 2023. The game received favourable reviews from critics, and was a commercial success, with more than twelve million copies sold on all platforms as of June 2022. A sequel, Cities: Skylines II, is set to be released in 2023.

Gameplay 

The player starts with a plot of land – equivalent to a  area – along with an interchange exit from a nearby highway, as well as a starting amount of in-game money. The player proceeds to add roads and residential, industrial and commercial zones, and basic services like power, water and sewage, to encourage residents to move in and supply them with jobs.

As the city grows beyond certain population tiers, the player unlocks new city improvements, including schools, fire stations, police stations, health care facilities and waste management systems, tax and government edicts, mass transit systems, and other features for managing the city. One such feature enables the player to designate parts of their city as districts. Each district can be configured by the player to restrict the types of developments permitted or to enforce specific regulations within the district's bounds, such as only allowing for industrial sectors devoted to agriculture, offering free public transportation for the district to reduce traffic, raising or reducing taxes for the various classes of development, or, with the Green Cities DLC, discouraging fossil-fuel vehicles from entering a district while not discouraging electric vehicles, reducing noise pollution caused by traffic.

Buildings in the city have various development levels that are met by improving the local area, with higher levels providing more benefits to the city. For example, a commercial store will increase in level if nearby residents are more educated, which in turn will allow it to hire more employees and increase tax revenue for the city. When the player has accumulated enough residents and money, they can purchase neighbouring plots of land, each equivalent in size to the starting land area, allowing them to build up eight additional parcels out of 25 within a  area. The parcel limitation is to allow the game to run across the widest range of personal computers, but players can use Steam Workshop modifications to open not only all of the game's standard 25-tile building area, but the entire map (81 tiles).

The game also features a robust transportation system based on Colossal Order's previous Cities in Motion, allowing the player to plan out effective public transportation for the city in order to reduce traffic congestion and generate transit revenue. Roads can be built straight or free-form, and the grid used for zoning adapts to the shape of the adjacent roads; cities need not follow a square grid plan. Roads of varying widths (up to major freeways) accommodate different traffic volumes, and variant road types (for example, avenues lined with trees or highways with sound barriers) offer reduced noise pollution or increased property values in the surrounding area at an increased cost to the player. The road system can be augmented with various forms of public transportation such as buses, taxis, trams, trains, ferries, and metro systems.

Modding, via the addition of user-generated content such as buildings or vehicles, is supported in Cities: Skylines through the Steam Workshop. The creation of an active content-generating community was stated as an explicit design goal. The game includes several pre-made terrains to build on, and also includes a map editor to allow users to create their own maps, including the use of real-world geographic features. Mods are also available to affect core gameplay elements; pre-packaged mods include the ability to bypass the aforementioned population tier unlock system, unlimited funds, and a higher difficulty setting.

Development 
Finnish developer Colossal Order, a thirteen-person studio at the time Cities: Skylines was released, had established its reputation with the Cities in Motion series, which primarily dealt with constructing transportation systems in pre-defined cities. They wanted to move from this into a larger city simulation like the SimCity franchise, and in preparation, developed Cities in Motion 2 using the Unity game engine to assure they had the capability to develop this larger effort. They pitched their ideas to their publisher, Paradox Interactive, but these initial pitches were focused on a political angle of managing a city rather than planning of it; the player would have been mayor of the city and set edicts and regulations to help their city grow. Paradox felt that these ideas did not present a strong enough case as to go up against the well-established SimCity, and had Colossal Order revise their approach.

The situation changed when the 2013 version of SimCity was released, and was critically panned due to several issues. Having gone back and forth with Colossal Order on the city simulation idea, Paradox used the market opportunity to greenlight the development of Cities: Skylines.

One goal of the game was to successfully simulate a city with up to a million residents. To help achieve this goal, the creators decided to simulate citizens navigating the city's roads and transit systems, to make the effects of road design and transit congestion a factor in city design. In this, they found that the growth and success of a city was fundamentally tied to how well the road system was laid out. Colossal Order had already been aware of the importance of road systems from Cities in Motion, and felt that the visual indication of traffic and traffic congestion was an easy-to-comprehend sign of larger problems in a city's design.

To represent traffic, Colossal Order developed a complex system that would determine the fastest route available for a simulated person going to and from work or other points of interest, taking into account available roads and public transit systems nearby. This simulated person would not swerve from their predetermined path unless the route was changed mid-transit, in which case they would be teleported back to their origin instead of calculating a new path from their current location. If the journey required the person to drive, a system of seven rules regulated their behaviour in traffic and how this was shown to the user, such as skipping some rules in locations of the simulation that had little impact while the player was not looking at those locations. This was done to avoid cascading traffic problems if the player adjusted the road system in real time. The city's user-designed transportation system creates a node-based graph used to determine these fastest paths and identifies intersections for these nodes. The system then simulates the movement of individuals on the roads and transit systems, accounting for other traffic on the road and basic physics (such as speed along slopes and the need for vehicles to slow down on tight curves), in order to accurately model traffic jams created by the layout and geography of the system. The developers found that their model accurately demonstrates the efficiency, or lack thereof, of some modern roadway intersections, such as the single-point urban interchange or the diverging diamond interchange.

Release 
Cities: Skylines was announced by publisher Paradox Interactive on 14 August 2014 at Gamescom. The announcement trailer emphasized that players could "build [their] dream city," "mod and share online" and "play offline"—the third feature was interpreted by journalists as a jab at SimCity, which initially required an Internet connection during play. Skylines uses an adapted Unity engine with official support for modding. The game was released on 10 March 2015, with Colossal Order committed to continuing to support the game after release.

Tantalus Media assisted Paradox in porting the game to the Xbox One console and for Windows 10, which was released on 21 April 2017. This version includes the After Dark expansion bundled with the game, and supports all downloadable content. Tantalus also ported the game and the After Dark expansion for PlayStation 4, released on 15 August 2017. Both Xbox One and PlayStation 4 versions received physical release versions distributed by Koch Media. Tantalus also ported the game for the Nintendo Switch, which was released on 13 September 2018 and included the "After Dark" and "Snowfall" expansions.

The game was built from the ground up to be friendly to player-created modifications, interfacing with Steam Workshop. Colossal Order found that with Cities in Motion, players had quickly begun to modify the game and expand on it. They wanted to encourage that behaviour in Cities: Skylines, as they recognized that modding ability was important to players and would not devalue the game. Within a month of the game's release, over 20,000 assets had been created in the Workshop, including modifications that enabled a first-person mode and a flying simulator. As of February 2020, over 200,000 user-created items were available. Many of these fans have been able to use crowd-funding services like Patreon to fund their creation efforts. Paradox, recognizing fan-supported mods, started to engage with some of the modders to create official content packs for the game starting in 2016. The first of these was a new set of art deco-inspired buildings created by Matt Crux. Crux received a portion of the sales of the content from Paradox.

An educational version of Cities: Skylines was developed by Colossal Order in conjunction with the group TeacherGaming and released in May 2018. This version includes tutorials and scenarios designed for use in a classroom, as well as a means for teachers to track a student's progress.

Remastered edition
A remastered version of Cities: Skylines was released exclusively for PlayStation 5 and Xbox Series X/S on 15 February 2023. The upgraded version includes a building area of up to 25 tiles, performance enhancements and other quality of life improvements. The upgrade released as a free download to players who previously owned the PlayStation 4 and Xbox One versions, respectively.

VR version
A virtual reality adaptation of the game titled Cities: VR, developed by Fast Travel Games, was released for Meta Quest 2 on April 28, 2022 and is set for release on PlayStation VR2.

Expansion packs 
Cities: Skylines offers several DLC expansion packs. Formerly, DLC was developed for the Linux/OS X/Windows versions first, while release for console versions tended to follow some months later. More recent expansions have been released on all platforms on the same day.

The game also offers several “Content Creator Packs” that focus on assets created by popular asset creators. For every content creator pack, a portion of the proceeds goes to the pack’s creator.

Below is a list of expansion packs provided by the developers.

Reception 

Upon release, Cities: Skylines received "generally positive" reception from critics, according to review aggregator Metacritic. IGN awarded the game a score of 8.5 and said "Don’t expect exciting scenarios or random events, but do expect to be impressed by the scale and many moving parts of this city-builder." Destructoid gave the game a 9 out of 10 with the reviewer stating, "Cities: Skylines not only returns to the ideals which made the city-building genre so popular, it expands them. I enjoyed every minute I played this title, and the planning, building, and nurturing of my city brought forth imagination and creativity from me like few titles ever have." The Escapist gave Cities: Skylines a perfect score, noting its low price point and stated that despite a few minor flaws, it is "the finest city builder in over a decade."

Much critical comparison was drawn between SimCity and Cities: Skylines, with the former seen as the benchmark of the genre by many, including the CEO of Colossal Order. When the game was first announced, journalists perceived it as a competitor to the poorly received, 2013 reboot of SimCity, describing it as "somewhat ... the antidote to Maxis' most recent effort with SimCity" and "out to satisfy where SimCity couldn't." A Eurogamer article touched upon "something of a size mismatch" between developer Colossal Order (then staffed by nine people) and Maxis, and their respective ambitions with Skylines and SimCity. Critics generally considered Cities: Skylines to have superseded SimCity as the leading game of the genre, with The Escapist comparing the two on a variety of factors and finding Cities: Skylines to be the better game in every category considered. However, some critics did consider the absence of disasters and random events to be something that the game lacked in comparison to SimCity, as well as a helpful and substantial tutorial. Disasters were added to the game in the aptly titled Natural Disasters DLC, as well as special buildings for detecting and responding to them.

The city government of Stockholm, where Paradox's headquarters are located, used Cities: Skylines to plan a new transportation system. The developer of Bus Simulator 18 planned out the roads and highways of the game's world map through Cities: Skylines before recreating it within their game to provide a seemingly realistic city and its facilities for the game. A Polish YouTuber recreated an interchange which was due to be built near Kraków in the game, showcasing its issues such as causing congestions and multiple lane-switching. In response, Polish General Directorate for National Roads and Highways ordered additional analysis, which confirmed the issues and the interchange was redesigned.

In 2020, Rock, Paper, Shotgun rated Cities: Skylines the fourth best management game on the PC.

Sales 
Cities: Skylines has been Paradox's best-selling published title: within 24 hours, 250,000 copies had been sold; within a week, 500,000 copies; within a month, one million copies; and on its first anniversary, the game had reached two million copies sold. By its second anniversary, the game had reached 3.5 million sales. In March 2018, it was revealed that the game had sold more than five million copies on the PC platform alone. On the game's fourth anniversary in March 2019, Colossal Order announced that Cities: Skylines had surpassed six million units sold across all platforms. In June 2022, it was announced that the game had sold 12 million copies on all platforms. It is the best-selling Finnish-developed game to date.

Sequel  
Paradox Interactive announced a sequel to Cities: Skylines in March 2023, titled Cities: Skylines II. The game is scheduled for release in 2023 for PlayStation 5, Xbox Series X/S, and Windows. It is set to feature more robust game mechanics, including greater modding capabilities and fully-realized economic and transit systems. The game will continue on the Unity game engine, and will allow the player access to more land; whereas the first game was limited to nine tiles (81 with user modifications) and the remastered edition to 25, the sequel will allow players to build out to 150 tiles. However, whether those tiles are the same size, smaller or even bigger than in the original, is not yet known.

Notes

References

External links 
 

2015 video games
City-building games
Construction and management simulation games
Linux games
MacOS games
Nintendo Switch games
Paradox Interactive games
PlayStation 4 games
PlayStation 4 Pro enhanced games
PlayStation Network games
Single-player video games
Video games with Steam Workshop support
Video games developed in Finland
Video games scored by Jonne Valtonen
Video games with expansion packs
Windows games
Xbox Cloud Gaming games
Xbox One games
Xbox One X enhanced games
Transport simulation games
Tantalus Media games
Stadia games
Colossal Order (company) games